"Don't Make Me Come to Vegas" is a song by singer-songwriter Tori Amos that originally appeared on her album Scarlet's Walk (2002). Following the success of previous remix singles "Professional Widow" (1996), "In the Springtime of his Voodoo" (1996) and "Jackie's Strength" (1998), the song was remixed in the same vein and served as the third single from the album. The single, released exclusively in the United States on 12" vinyl in a picture sleeve, features three remixes of the album version of the track by Timo Maas.

"Don't Make Me Come to Vegas" is also the last physical single released commercially in Amos' career to date.  It has not appeared on any greatest hits or box set collections.

Song Info
Amos explains the story to this particular song in her promo-only release of "Scarlet Stories":

Track listing
 Don't Make Me Come to Vegas (Timo on Tori) (7:45)
 Don't Make Me Come to Vegas (Timo on Tori Alternate Version) (6:45)
 Don't Make Me Come to Vegas (Timo on Tori Breaks Remix) (8:57)

US Charts

2003 singles
Tori Amos songs
Songs written by Tori Amos
2002 songs
Epic Records singles